Cokethorpe School is an independent day school in Hardwick, West Oxfordshire, about  south of Witney. It was founded in 1957 by Francis Brown. It is a member of HMC, IAPS, and The Society of Heads (formerly known as SHMIS). The school has approximately 660 students ranging in age from 4 to 18. The Prep School and the Senior School are on the same site.

At the heart of the school is an early 18th-century Grade II* listed Queen Anne style country house. The tower of the chapel was virtually destroyed in a fire in 1994, but it has since been demolished and rebuilt. The grounds have a number of rugby/football pitches along with the recently built astro pitches. An expertly carved 'giant' peacock stands at the central crossroads within the school grounds, a symbol of the school.

The school has an outstanding recent sporting tradition with students playing national age group rugby (England under-16 and under-18) and also England women's hockey. The school also has numerous representatives in both regional and Oxfordshire rugby, football, cricket, hockey, athletics, and tennis. The school has also developed a reputation as a premier kayaking and sailing school, as well as for nurturing equestrian talents.

The school operates a house system, with houses called Harcourt, Gascoigne, Swift, Queen Anne, Vanbrugh, Lower House (Year 7) and Feilden. The houses compete in sports such as house rugby and football for boys; hockey and netball for girls; and in field and track events at the annual school sports day. There are also competitions in the arts, such as house music, drama, photography and art.

On-site is a theatre called The Shed, where drama productions, concerts and lectures are held. These can range from musicals to dance, even hip hop competitions.

History

The country house was used by Simon Harcourt, 1st Viscount Harcourt. When Major Percy Henry Guy Feilden and his wife, Dorothy Louisa Brand, moved there in 1908, they undertook extensive renovations. He died on 25 March 1944 and was buried there. His son, Major-General Randle Guy Feilden, who was later knighted, was his successor. In 1957, it was left with part of the grounds to Francis Brown, who opened the school as a secondary boys' boarding school with 14 pupils. In about 1960 Yarnton Manor was used as a dormitory of the school. In 1963 a charitable trust was formed, and in 1966 the school buildings and grounds were sold to the school trustees.

The school is a joint Church of England and Roman Catholic foundation. The chapel is on the golf course on the school grounds. It is the former parish church of Hardwick and was restored and extended in 1973.

In 1985 the roof of the northwest wing was studied while the building was being repaired. In 1986 work began on the construction of further buildings. The School started admitting girls in 1992 and opened a Prep School in 1994. The boarding facility was closed in 2003.

Notable former pupils

 Martin Edwards, a former Manchester United chairman 
 Richard and Michael Hills, twins and both successful flat racing jockeys in the UK.
Toby Sebastian, Actor – starring in the hit series Game of Thrones
Henry Purdy, Rugby Player at Gloucester Rugby
Florence Pugh, Actress (attended Cokethorpe Prep School)

References

1957 establishments in England
Educational institutions established in 1957
Grade II* listed buildings in Oxfordshire
Grade II* listed educational buildings
Private schools in Oxfordshire
Member schools of the Headmasters' and Headmistresses' Conference